The Dublin City University Saints was a former American football team of Dublin City University, Ireland. Established in 2005, the DCU Saints initially competed in the Irish American Football League (IAFL) for five seasons, reaching the playoffs in 2008 and 2009. The team collapsed following the conclusion of the league's 2010 season, before attempting to unsuccessfully reform for the 2013 season.

Colours
The DCU Saints followed a similar colour scheme to other DCU clubs: royal blue and gold.  The team had both home and away strips: the home being navy blue and gold; the away white and gold.

History

2005
The DCU American Football club was established in 2005 by Carl Rushe and Maurice Cosgrave. The club initially provided flag football training and access to some of the NFL games.  As with all new clubs and societies DCU the club had to undergo a probationary period.  During this time the club was focused on allowing fans of the sport learn more about it and to establish itself as a viable club in the University.

2006
In 2006, interest in the club increased immensely; over 150 students signed up to the club at the start of the University year and this figure rose to close to 180 by the end.  In 2006 the club also applied to and was accepted by the IAFL and began training DCU's first ever fully kitted American Football team, the DCU Saints.  For the 2006 season the club also managed to secure some of the most experienced and well-regarded coaches in Ireland including Team Ireland Head Coach Phil De Monte, Team Ireland Defensive Co-ordinator Darrin O'Toole and German League coach Carsten Wunderlich.  Also in 2006 the DCU Cheerleading Squad was formed with the assistance of DCU Dance.

Towards the end of 2006 the club was honoured with an award from DCU and the Sports Clubs Committee (SCC) at the annual Clubs & Societies Awards; the Most Improved Club 2006 award which recognises the considerable development undergone by the club in the past year.  Additionally, club Secretary and co-founder Maurice Cosgrave was awarded the Best Individual Administrator Award.

2007
2007 was a development year for the DCU Saints.  With a new coaching and management staff in place, the team focused on developing experienced players and passing on this experience to new players. This was evident in the improvement of our record this year with two wins, both against two established teams.

2008
This year marks a fresh start for the Saints.  With a greater influx of players and increasing win record, the Saints have shown the ability and the drive to improve again.

The season started badly with a loss to the Carrickfergus Knights but the team started 11 rookies that day and stayed close to the experienced Knights which gave hope for the future.

The game against Tallaght Outlaws was dominated by the weather, with storms turning the pitch into a quagmire. The Saints took a while to get going, particularly on offence, but when they clicked they ran away with the game, racking up a record 44 points while not conceding a score.

The victory gave the team added confidence and they followed up with a victory over the Rhinos, 32-3. Again the team took time to get going on offence but eventually clicked to run away easy winners, the Rhinos score only coming after a botched call by the officials.

The two games against Dublin Rebels showed the team had a lot to learn and must front up more if they are to win a game against one of the big three (Rebels, UL, Cork)

The team got back into the groove again with a second victory over the Rhinos, this time the passing game working perfectly with David Mullins a particular standout. The Rhinos scored a touchdown on a controversial call by the officials but it did not matter as the Saints scored five touchdowns. 

On 29 June, the Saints beat Belfast in Belfast by a score of 6-0 to clinch a wildcard spot in the playoffs for the first time in their history. They travelled to Cork to face the Admirals having lost their last regular season game to UL Vikings, finishing the regular season 4-4.

In Cork, the Saints lost their first ever play-off game by a score of 34-2 to bring to end their best season to date.

2009
The DCU Saints started the 2009 season on 29 March 2009 at home against the Dublin Rhinos. A close game ended 18-18 (which included Saints linebacker Conor Tyrrell blocking an extra point attempt) and DCU were off to a good start. This good start was undone a week later in Carrickfergus when the Knights beat DCU 19-6, the Saints sole score coming from a fumble recovered by linebacker Joe Carlyle.

Two weeks later, DCU disimproved to 0-2-1 on the year as they were forced to forfeit a game against league Champions, UL Vikings.

DCU came crashing back down to earth at the end of May when Cork destroyed the visitors by 52-0 in a lopsided win. Two weeks later, DCU lost again, this time to the Dublin Rebels, by 27-6. Going into the final game of the regular season, DCU (in a mirror image of the 2008 season, against the Belfast Bulls) needed to beat a team who had beaten them earlier on in the year, the Cork Admirals. DCU duly complied, in a defensive battle in which DCU got their only shut-out of the season and earned a tough fought 8-0 victory to qualify for the post season for the second time in their history while simultaneously ensuring Cork would fail to make the playoffs.

In the playoffs, DCU faced an impressive Dublin Rebels team in the semi-finals. The Rebels proved to be too impressive, routing DCU in a 38-0 loss. The disappointing loss ended DCU’s season, which was their best season in the club’s history.

2013
After a 3-year absence from the IAFL, DCU attempted to re-enter the IAFL Shamrock Bowl Conference in 2013 but disbanded prior to the start of the season.

2013 staff

Management
 Chairperson: Matthew Griffin
 Secretary: 
 Treasurer: 
 Public Relations Officer:
 Safety Officer:  
 Webmaster: Damian Baker

Coaching
 Head Coach: John Collins
 Head Coach Assistant: 
 Line Coach: 
 Defensive Coordinator: 
 Special Teams Coach: 
 Assistant Coach: 
 Assistant Coach:

Records

References

External links
 IAFL official website

Sport at Dublin City University
American football teams in the Republic of Ireland
American football teams in County Dublin
2006 establishments in Ireland
American football teams established in 2006
2013 disestablishments in Ireland
American football teams disestablished in 2013